David Jablonský (born 8 October 1991) is a Czech professional footballer who plays as a centre-back for Ekstraklasa club Cracovia.

Career
On 9 January 2017, Jablonský signed a two-and-a-half-year contract with Bulgarian club Levski Sofia. In his third match for Levski, he scored the winning goal in the Bulgarian eternal derby against CSKA Sofia in a 2–1 win. He also won a penalty converted by Roman Procházka for the equalizer in the second half. David went on to establish himself as a vital part of the team, being responsible for ten clean sheets in the first half of the 2017–18 season, while also being the top scorer of Levski with nine goals. He managed to get himself on the scoresheet in another Eternal derby, netting the first goal in a 2–2 draw. 

In September 2020, he was banned by FIFA from any football activities for 18 months for match-fixing while playing for FK Teplice in 2012. He returned to training in early 2022.

Honours
Cracovia
 Polish Cup: 2019–20

Individual
 Bulgarian First League Best Defender: 2017

References

References
 Guardian Football
 
 
 Profile at LevskiSofia.info

1991 births
Living people
Czech footballers
FK Teplice players
FK Čáslav players
FK Ústí nad Labem players
FC Tom Tomsk players
PFC Levski Sofia players
MKS Cracovia (football) players
Czech First League players
Russian Premier League players
First Professional Football League (Bulgaria) players
Ekstraklasa players
Czech expatriate footballers
Expatriate footballers in Russia
Expatriate footballers in Bulgaria
Expatriate footballers in Poland
Association football defenders
People from Sokolov
FK Baník Sokolov players
Sportspeople from the Karlovy Vary Region